Blues in Orbit is an album by jazz composer, arranger, conductor and pianist Gil Evans, recorded in 1969 and 1971 by Evans with an orchestra featuring Jimmy Cleveland, Howard Johnson, Billy Harper, and Joe Beck. The album was originally released on the short-lived Ampex label as Gil Evans (1970) but received wider release on the Enja label under this title.

Reception
The Allmusic review by Scott Yanow awarded the album 4½ stars, stating: "Arranger Gil Evans's first recording as a leader in five years found him leading an orchestra that could be considered a transition between his 1950s groups and his somewhat electric band of the 1970s... A near-classic release."

Track listing
All compositions by Gil Evans except as indicated
 "Thoroughbred" (Billy Harper) - 4:57
 "Spaced" - 3:04
 "Love In the Open" (Warren Smith) - 6:49
 "Variation on the Misery" - 3:03
 "Blues In Orbit" (George Russell) - 6:49
 "Proclamation" - 1:48
 "General Assembly" (updated and renamed "The Time of the Barracudas" by Miles Davis and Gil Evans) - 7:12
 "So Long" - 2:27  
Recorded in New York in 1969 (tracks 2–4 & 6–8) and 1971 (tracks 1 & 5)

Personnel 
 Gil Evans - piano, electric piano, arranger, conductor
 Johnny Coles (tracks 1 & 5), Mike Lawrence (tracks 2–4 & 6–8), Ernie Royal (tracks 1 & 5), Snooky Young (tracks 2–4 & 6–8) - trumpet  
 Garnett Brown (tracks 1 & 5), Jimmy Cleveland, Jimmy Knepper (tracks 2–4 & 6–8) - trombone  
 Ray Alonge (tracks 1 & 5), Julius Watkins (tracks 2–4 & 6–8) - French horn  
 Howard Johnson - tuba, baritone saxophone  
 Hubert Laws - flute (tracks 2–4 & 6–8)
 Billy Harper - tenor saxophone
 George Marge - flute, tenor saxophone (tracks 1 & 5)    
 Joe Beck - guitar (tracks 2–4 & 6–8) 
 Gene Bianco - harp  
 Herb Bushler - bass  
 Elvin Jones (tracks 2–4 & 6–8), Alphonse Mouzon (tracks 1 & 5) - drums
 Sue Evans, Donald McDonald - percussion

References 

1980 albums
Gil Evans albums
Albums arranged by Gil Evans
Enja Records albums